The Route du Rhum is a single person transatlantic race the 2010 race was the 10th edition and had six classes with 91 boats taking part.

Ultime

Multi 50

IMOCA 60

Class 40

Rhum

External Links
 
 Official You Tube Channel

Reference

Route du Rhum
2014 in sailing
Route du Rhum
Single-handed sailing competitions
Class40 competitions
IMOCA 60 competitions